The Wingle (风骏) 7 is a pick-up truck manufactured by the Chinese company Great Wall Motors since 2018.

Overview
The Wingle 7 is equipped with a two-liter 143-horsepower diesel engine, a six-speed manual transmission and all-wheel drive with a Borg Warner transfer case with a downshift and a forced locking rear differential. The cargo bed dimensions is 1680x1460x480 mm. The pickup itself is almost 5.4 meters long, and its carrying capacity is 975 kg.

Wingle 7 EV 
The Wingle 7 EV was announced by GWM at the 2019 Chengdu Motor Show, claimed to have a 150 kW (201hp) motor, peak torque of 300 Nm, and a battery capacity of 60kWh.

References 

Trucks of China
Great Wall Motors vehicles
2010s cars

Production electric cars